Monseñor Nouel is a province in the central region of the Dominican Republic. It was split from La Vega province in 1982.

Name
The province is named after Monseñor Dr. Adolfo Alejandro Nouel y Bobadilla (1862-1937), an Archbishop of Santo Domingo who was briefly President of the Republic from 1912 to 1913.

History
Upon the arrival of the Spaniards, the territory of the Monsignor Nouel province belonged to the Taino Maguá chiefdom. In 1495, Bartolomé Colón, during a voyage of exploration across the island, ordered the construction of a fortress in Sonador to combat the resistance of the local Tainos commanded by a chief named Bonao.

It is said that the first fort built in the place was called Bonao Abajo, La Colonia or La Entrada, which was later occupied by the people of Francisco Roldán. The Indians of Rincón de Yuboa or Bonao Arriba, beaten and pressured by the Spaniards, disappeared from the place rising towards the caves of Último Cielo, in the Los Capaces jurisdiction.

In 1497, Francisco Roldán and 70 rebels, participants in the Roldán Rebellion, and took refuge in the territory of Bonao, rebelling against the authority of the Columbus brothers. The rebellion ended in October 1498. The origins of the town of Bonao are precisely associated with this rebellion, insofar as some of those who participated in it stayed there when it ended.

On December 7, 1508, Bonao was officially granted the category of town and was awarded a coat of arms. The main economic activity of this town was gold mining. When the exploitation of gold by the Spanish on the island was exhausted, two sugar mills were installed in Bonao, according to Bachelor Alonso de Parada in a report made to King Carlos V and that appears in the book Santo Domingo in the Manuscripts of Juan Bautista Muñoz transcribed by Roberto Marte:

The name of Monseñor Nouel, associated with Bonao, arose for the first time in 1936 of Santo Domingo in honor of the former president of the Republic. In 1960, the town's name Bonao was restored, the municipality remaining with its name Monseñor Nouel, a designation that was also given to the province when it was created in 1982 under the government of then-President Salvador Jorge Blanco.

Geography

The province has an area of 992.39 km2 (383.16 sq mi) located in the central Cibao region. It is bordered to the North and West, by the La Vega Province, to the East the Sánchez Ramírez and Monte Plata provinces, and to the South by the San Cristóbal and San José de Ocoa provinces. The Central Mountain Range is located to the north and west of the province, while a branch of said mountain range, the Sierra de Yamasá, borders the province to the east. The main river in the province is the Yuna; all other rivers are tributaries of that river. Some of them are the Blanco, Maimon, Juma, Masipedro, Jima rivers. The Rincón dam is also located in this province.

Economy and development
The main economic activity of the area is dominated by local businesses, agricultural producers and by the income generated by the mining company (Falcondo), also known as Falconbridge Dominicana. Ferronickel exploitation is located in this province, the main metallic mining activity in the country today. The main agricultural items in the province are rice, coffee and cocoa. There are also important companies that provide jobs such as: Bonao Industrial, Hanesbrands Dos Rios Textiles, Inc.

There are several public and private basic and secondary educational establishments in the province, specializing in commerce, informatics, industrial technicians; polytechnics and other fields. The city of Bonao also has a higher education center, a regional headquarters of the state Autonomous University of Santo Domingo (CURCE-UASD).

The province is home to several communication media centers, such as Television, Radio and Digital Media. In the television media, the province has the Telecasa company that offers different television channels for the towns of Bonao and Maimón, among these channels are: Yunavisión Channel 10, Maimón Tv Channel 3 and Bonao Tv Channel 12. In the media of radio are: Latina FM and Novel 93 FM.

Municipalities and municipal districts

The province as of June 20, 2006 is divided into the following municipalities (municipios) and municipal districts (distrito municipal - D.M.) within them:
Bonao
Arroyo Toro-Masipedro (D.M.)
Jayaco (D.M.)
Juma Bejucal (D.M.)
La Salvia-Los Quemados
Sabana del Puerto (D.M.)
Maimón
Piedra Blanca 
Juan Adrián (D.M.)
Villa Sonador (D.M.)

The following is a sortable table of the municipalities and municipal districts with population figures as of the 2012 census. Urban population are those living in the seats (cabeceras literally heads) of municipalities or of municipal districts. Rural population are those living in the districts (Secciones literally sections) and neighborhoods (Parajes literally places) outside of them.

For comparison with the municipalities and municipal districts of other provinces see the list of municipalities and municipal districts of the Dominican Republic.

References

External links
  Oficina Nacional de Estadística, Statistics Portal of the Dominican Republic
  Oficina Nacional de Estadística, Maps with administrative division of the provinces of the Dominican Republic, downloadable in PDF format

 
Provinces of the Dominican Republic
States and territories established in 1982